Machecoul-Saint-Même is a commune in the department of Loire-Atlantique, western France. The municipality was established on 1 January 2016 by merger of the former communes of Machecoul and Saint-Même-le-Tenu. Machecoul station has rail connections to Saint-Gilles-Croix-de-Vie and Nantes.

Population

See also 
Communes of the Loire-Atlantique department

References 

Communes of Loire-Atlantique
Populated places established in 2016
2016 establishments in France